Encounter is a 2018 South Korean television series starring Song Hye-kyo and Park Bo-gum. 
It aired on tvN on Wednesdays and Thursdays at 21:30 (KST) time slot from November 28, 2018, to January 24, 2019 for 16 episodes. It is one of the highest-rated Korean dramas in cable television history.

Internationally, the series streams via ViuTV and Viki, and has been sold to several South East Asian countries, as well as Mnet Japan which will air it in over 100 countries.

Synopsis
Brought together by fate, a woman who seems to have everything and a young man who seems to have nothing decide to give up an ordinary life to be together. Cha Soo-hyun (Song Hye-kyo), daughter of a politician, lives a pathetic life guided by others. She was sold off (married) to a rich family, only to divorce her husband because of his affair. Her former mother-in-law adds as a condition to her divorce that Soo-hyun must (continue to) attend that family's functions, such as funerals, etc., when called.

One day while on a business trip in Cuba, she meets Kim Jin-hyuk (Park Bo-gum), a free-spirited guy. They spend time together. After they go back to South Korea, he meets her again but as an employee in the Donghwa Hotel, which she received as alimony. They are attracted to each other, yet only their fate will decide whether they can end up being together.

Cast

Main
 Song Hye-kyo as Cha Soo-hyun
A daughter of a prominent politician and former daughter-in-law of a wealthy family.
 Park Bo-gum as Kim Jin-hyuk
A freewheeling, ordinary young man who finds joy in the simplest things.

Supporting

People around Cha Soo-hyun
 Jang Seung-jo as Jung Woo-seok
Cha Soo-hyun's ex-husband.
 Moon Sung-keun as Cha Jong-hyun
Cha Soo-hyun's father.
 Nam Gi-ae as Jin Mi-ock
Cha Soo-hyun's mother.
 Ko Chang-seok as Nam Myeong-sik
Cha Soo-hyun's driver.
 Kwak Sun-young as Jang Mi-jin
Cha Soo-hyun's secretary.
 Cha Hwa-yeon as Chairman Kim Hwa-jin
Jung Woo-seok's mother.

People around Kim Jin-hyuk
 Shin Jung-geun as Kim Jang-soo
Kim Jin-hyuk's father.
 Baek Ji-won as Joo Yeon-ja
Kim Jin-hyuk's mother.
 Pyo Ji-hoon as Kim Jin-myung
Kim Jin-hyuk's younger brother.
 Kim Joo-hun as Lee Dae-chan
Kim Jin-hyuk's friend who opens a restaurant.

Donghwa Hotel
 Kim Hye-eun as Kim Sun-joo
Kim Jin-hyuk's PR department leader at work.
 Jeon So-nee as Jo Hye-in
Kim Jin-hyuk's friend and senior at work.
  as Lee Jin-ho
Kim Jin-hyuk's workmate.
  as Park Han-gil
Kim Jin-hyuk's workmate.
 Park Jin-joo as Eun-jin
Kim Jin-hyuk's workmate who has an interest in him.
  as Choi Jin-cheul
 Shin Soo-yeon as Ji-yoo
 Kim Sun-joo's daughter.

Production
The first script reading was held on August 23, 2018. Principal photography began in September 2018, with part of the filming taking place in Cuba.

Original soundtrack

Part 1

Part 2

Part 3

Part 4

Part 5

Part 6

Part 7

Part 8

Part 9

Viewership
An 8.7% viewership rating was recorded nationwide for the series first episode, making it the fourth-highest premiere rating of the network after Hospital Playlist 2, Jirisan, and Mr. Sunshine.

Adaptation
In 2021, Viva Television and Cignal Entertainment produced a Philippine remake based on Encounter''. It premiered on March 20, 2021 on TV5.

References

External links
  
 Encounter
 
 

Korean-language television shows
TVN (South Korean TV channel) television dramas
2018 South Korean television series debuts
2019 South Korean television series endings
South Korean romance television series
South Korean melodrama television series
Television series by Studio Dragon
Television series by Bon Factory Worldwide
Havana in fiction
Television shows set in Seoul